The Western Pacific Railroad Museum (WPRM) in Portola, California, known as the Portola Railroad Museum until January 1, 2006, is a heritage railroad and archives that preserves and operates historic American railroad equipment and preserves documents, photos and information. The museum's mission is to preserve the history of the Western Pacific Railroad and is operated by the Feather River Rail Society , founded in 1983. It is located at a former Western Pacific locomotive facility, adjacent to the Union Pacific's former Western Pacific mainline through the Feather River Canyon.

Overview

Museum collection
The museum holds in its collection twenty-nine diesel locomotives, one electric locomotive, one steam locomotive (Operational as of April 2022), fifteen passenger cars (including four from the famous California Zephyr (1949–1970) train), numerous freight and maintenance cars and eighteen cabooses. They offer excursions and a "Run A Locomotive" program during the summer. The WPRM has one of the larger collections of early diesel era locomotives and freight cars in North America. The museum is often considered to have one of the most complete and historic collections of equipment and materials from a single railroad family. The holdings also include extensive corporate records and images, as well as personal collections from those who worked for the Western Pacific. 
The WPRM is a "hands-on" museum that allows visitors to board and explore locomotives and cars in their collection.
Among the significant pieces in the WPRM collection are Western Pacific 805-A, an FP7 model passenger locomotive that pulled the California_Zephyr_(1949–1970); Southern Pacific EMD GP9 #2873, nicknamed "the Kodachrome" by the volunteers, due to it being painted with the Kodachrome scheme from the failed Santa Fe–Southern Pacific merger; WP 2001, the first GP20 model locomotive (an early turbocharged diesel); WP 501, an early switch engine and the first diesel purchased by the Western Pacific; Western Pacific 0-6-0 steam locomotive 165, an oil burning switch engine built by ALCO in 1919; WP 37, a 200-ton rail-mounted crane, two track clearing snowplows (one wedge type and one rotary); and several rare, early 20th century freight cars. Also located at the site are the Portola Diesel Shop, built in 1953, and an interlocking tower from Oakland, California, currently stored unrebuilt. The Western Pacific Hospital, built in 1911 and one of the few remaining railroad hospitals in the country, was part of the museum until it was destroyed in an arson fire on September 7, 2011. The WPRM maintains several of their road diesels in mainline operating condition and has made occasional movements on Class I railroads using their own historic motive power.

Operating a locomotive

One aspect of the Western Pacific Railroad Museum is its nationally known Run A Locomotive (RAL) program. Except for winter and certain weekends when special events are in progress, the museum provides visitors a chance to be an engineer for an hour. Participants are given on-the-ground instruction, then they get to operate a real locomotive of their choice for an hour. A qualified engineer joins them in the locomotive for oversight and further instruction.

Zephyr Project
The Zephyr Project is a program of the Feather River Rail Society to acquire, preserve and restore cars, locomotives, personal stories and artifacts relating to the California Zephyr passenger train. Currently, the Project's collection of equipment includes Western Pacific FP7 locomotive 805-A, dome lounge car "Silver Hostel", dome-coach "Silver Lodge" and dining car "Silver Plate". In addition, the dome-coach "Silver Rifle" is on long-term loan from the Golden Gate Railroad Museum.

See also 

Feather River Route
Clio trestle
Keddie Wye
 List of California railroads
 List of heritage railroads in California
 List of museums in California
 List of railway museums
 List of common carrier freight railroads in the United States

References

External links
 www.wplives.org — official Western Pacific Railroad Museum site
 The WP 165 Restoration Blog The progress on the restoration of Western Pacific 0-6-0 #165 steam locomotive until September 22, 2017.
 WP 165 Page at WPLives.org Latest updates on the restoration of Western Pacific 0-6-0 #165 steam locomotive.
 RailPictures.Net: WPRM – Photographs from the Western Pacific Railroad Museum.
 RailPictures.Net: PRM – More Western Pacific Railroad Museum photographs. (Under the Portola name)

Railroad museums in California
Western Pacific Railroad
California railroads
Heritage railroads in California
Museums established in 1984
Open-air museums in California
Museums in Plumas County, California